Pee Dee River Rice Planters Historic District is a set of historic rice plantation properties and national historic district located near Georgetown, Georgetown County, South Carolina.

Historic features
The district encompasses 10 contributing building, 16 contributing sites, and 34 contributing structures.

Pee Dee River plantations
It includes extant buildings, structures, and ricefields associated with 12 rice plantations located along the Pee Dee River.
They include:
Hasty Point, 
Breakwater, 
Belle Rive, 
Exchange, 
Rosebank, 
Chicora Wood Plantation, 
Guendalos, 
Enfield, 
Birdfield, 
Arundel Plantation, 
Springfield, 
Dirleton

Waccamaw River plantations
It also includes five rice plantations located along the Waccamaw River:
Turkey Hill, 
Oatland, 
Willbrook, 
Litchfield, 
Waverly

Rice planters culture
These plantations were part of a large rice culture in the county which flourished from about 1750 to about 1910.

This district includes:
 Four plantation houses (at Exchange, Rosebank, Chicora Wood, and Dirleton); 
 Two rice barns (at Hasty Point and Exchange); 
 Collections of plantation outbuildings (at Chicora Wood and Arundel); 
 Rice mill and chimney (at Chicora Wood); 
 Historic ricefields with canals, dikes, and trunks.

The plantation houses are all frame houses with a central hall plan.

The Pee Dee River Rice Planters Historic District was listed on the National Register of Historic Places in 1988.

See also
National Register of Historic Places listings in Georgetown County, South Carolina

References

External links

Plantations in South Carolina
Historic districts on the National Register of Historic Places in South Carolina
Buildings and structures in Georgetown County, South Carolina
National Register of Historic Places in Georgetown County, South Carolina
Historic American Buildings Survey in South Carolina
Slave cabins and quarters in the United States